William Gregford (aka William Gregforth, died 1487/88) was a Master of University College, Oxford, England.

Gregford was a Fellow at University College from 1453/4. He was vicar of Shipton-under-Wychwood in west Oxfordshire from 1465. He became Master in 1473 until his death in 1487 or 1488. The College Chapel was dedicated on 30 April 1476, during Gregford's time as Master.

References 

Year of birth missing
1488 deaths
15th-century English people
15th-century scholars
Fellows of University College, Oxford
Masters of University College, Oxford
15th-century English Roman Catholic priests